Football in New Zealand  can refer to

Association football in New Zealand
Rugby league in New Zealand 
Rugby union in New Zealand 
Australian rules football in New Zealand